Pulse is the seventh studio album by American singer and songwriter Toni Braxton. It was released on May 4, 2010, by Atlantic Records. Her first album in five years and served as Braxton's debut for the Atlantic label, after signing a new record deal. Production for the album took place during September 2008 to March 2010 and was handled by several record producers, including David Foster, Harvey Mason, Jr., Frank E, Oak Felder, Lucas Secon,  Simon Franglen and Stargate. Pulse features up-tempo songs and R&B ballads with production varying from smooth to dance-based styles.

Upon its release, Pulse was released to positive reception from music critics, who complimented its execution, calling a return to form. Criticism mainly targeted the album's trend-chasing nature. Commercially, Pulse debuted and peaked at number 9 on the US Billboard 200, selling 54,000 copies in its first week. It also entered the top 10 in Switzerland as well as the top 20 in Germany and Greece. By February 2014, Pulse had sold 156,000 copies in the United States. Its three singles, "Yesterday", "Hands Tied" and "Make My Heart," achieved moderate chart success.

Background
In October 2009, Atlantic Records chairman Craig Kallman revealed that the label had signed Braxton. Production for the album took place during September 2008 to March 2010 and was handled by several record producers, including David Foster, Harvey Mason, Jr., DJ Frank E, Oak, Lucas Secon, Simon Franglen and Dapo Torimiro. The entertainment outlet Rap-Up revealed, that Braxton also collaborated with Robin Thicke, Trey Songz, Usher, while other reported collaborations included Claude Kelly, and Steve Mac. R&B songwriter and singer Ne-Yo also worked on songs for the album.

Speaking of the thinking behind titling the album Pulse, Braxton explained to UK R&B writer Pete Lewis, Deputy Editor of Blues & Soul, in May 2010: "It comes from when I got ill. I went into cardic rehab, and there was this older lady there. She was like 'What are you doing here so young? It must have been your heart. You know what? This is my fourth heart-attack and you're so young, you can't be AFRAID! You can't stop LIVING!'... Then she told me how she'd just got back from holiday with her 40-year-old boyfriend! And because I'd lost hope – the doctors had told me I'd never be able to record again – her conversation was like that heartbeat, that pulse that gave me back the love of life."

Music
In an interview with Digital Spy, Braxton explained that she had recorded around 30 songs and would like to collaborate with artists, such as Alicia Keys. Braxton also explained the delay of the album: "The album was supposed to come out in February, but we held it back because seven of the ten songs we picked were leaked. We decided to go back to the studio, record four or five more songs and then pick. Now we send everything via Federal Express – nothing's going through the internet – and that's why none of the new songs have leaked so far." The song "Woman" is a cover version of the original song by Delta Goodrem from her 2007 album Delta.

For the collaborations which none of them made the final album pressings. However, the deluxe edition of the album on the iTunes Store contains several of them as bonus tracks including the remix of "Yesterday" featuring Trey Songz, "The Wave" written by Jesse McCartney and Makeba Riddick, "Stay", "Rewind" and "Yesterday (Cutmore Radio Remix)". It also features the high publicised "Caught (Don't Take Your Hat Off)" featuring Academy Award winning actress Mo'Nique, who appears in the middle of the song with a dramatic monologue.

The collaboration with R&B singer Robin Thicke called "Don't Leave" would have featured on Braxton's vocals with Thicke providing production. Whilst the high-profile collaboration with fellow R&B singer Usher also failed to materialize. Amongst reports that Braxton was working with Rodney "Darkchild" Jerkins, a song tipped to be produced by Darkchild called "Get Loose" was also omitted from the album. Additionally reggae singer Sean Paul recorded some vocals for a remix of "Lookin' At Me" but it is currently unknown what will become of the remix since it is not featured on the album.

Release and promotion
The album were scheduled to be released in 2009, but it was then being pushed back to February 2, 2010, before ultimately being released May 4, 2010, by Atlantic Records. Braxton told Rap-Up, that the album had been pushed back, because all 7 of those album's ten songs were leaked and so she has decided to go back into the studio to begin recording some new songs. The official cover art of the album was released on March 9, 2010. Amazon.com streamed a different song from Pulse each week up until the album's release day. Braxton performed "Make My Heart" on The Ellen DeGeneres Show on April 27, 2010, The Wendy Williams Show and gave an interview on Good Day L.A.. On May 3, 2010, she performed "Hands Tied" and "Breathe Again" on The Mo'Nique Show. "Hands Tied" was also performed on May 4, 2010 on The Today Show along with her most successful single "Un-Break My Heart".

Singles
The album's first single, "Yesterday" was released digitally on November 20, 2009. This version, which features guest vocals from a fellow singer Trey Songz, was also released with the latter serving as the US single, whilst the former was serviced internationally. The song peaked at number 12 on the US Hot R&B/Hip-Hop Songs chart.

The music video for two singles; "Hands Tied" and "Make My Heart" with director Bille Woodruff, who worked with Braxton previously, including on the videos for "Un-Break My Heart" and "He Wasn't Man Enough". The video for "Make My Heart" premiered on April 13 whilst the video for "Hands Tied" was released on April 14, 2010. "Hands Tied" has so far peaked at No. 29 on the Hot R&B/Hip-Hop Songs.

Other songs
The music video for the song "Woman" premiered June 28, 2010, on Yahoo! Music. The video shows a live performance of the song.

"Stay", previously only available on the deluxe edition of the album, was made available for streaming on August 23, 2019 by X5 Music Group.

Critical reception

Upon its release, the album received positive reviews from most music critics, based on an aggregate score of 71/100 from Metacritic. Allmusic writer Andy Kellman gave it 4 out of 5 stars and commended its material's themes, noting "a high level of conviction that does not waver, and it's particularly impressive given that the album covers so many stages of a romantic relationship". USA Todays Steve Jones gave the album 3 out of 4 stars and viewed it as "a return to form" for Braxton. Ken Capobianco of The Boston Globe gave Pulse a positive review and wrote favorably of its execution, stating "Braxton and her star producers and songwriters mix old-school R&B balladry and modern dance pop while always keeping that luxurious voice as the focus".

In contrast, Los Angeles Times writer Mikael Wood gave it 2 out of 4 stars and expressed a mixed response to "her attempt to keep up with" contemporary R&B artists, writing that "the flimsy material can't quite conceal her hit-hungry desperation". BBC Music's Natalie Shaw shared a similar sentiment, writing that the album "misfires when its slower numbers are interspersed with uptempo tracks ready-made for the younger market". Mark Edward Nero of About.com gave the album 3 out of 5 stars and wrote that "no new ground is broken, no significant risks are taken and the album as a whole doesn't really have any must-hear tracks", but recommended it to listeners of Braxton's previous work and noted that she "can still sing strongly and passionately". The Washington Posts Sarah Godfrey commended the album's "club tracks" and wrote favorably of Braxton's "trusty album architecture of scorching dance songs, soft-focused up-tempo ballads and "Un-Break My Heart"-style tear-jerkers without going too over-the-top".

Commercial performance
The album debuted at number 9 on the US Billboard 200, with first-week sales of 54,000 copies, making it Braxton's fifth US top-ten album. It also entered at number one on Billboards R&B/Hip-Hop Albums chart. In its second week, Pulse dropped to number 22 and has sold 16,588 in the United States. On the third week, the album dropped to number 41. In Canada, Pulse debuted at number 72 on the Top 100 Albums chart, and in the United Kingdom, it debuted at number 28 on the Top 40 Albums and at number 7 on the R&B Albums chart.

Track listing

Notes
 signifies vocal producer
 signifies additional producer
Sample credits
"Make My Heart" contains elements of "We're Going to a Party" (1977), performed by Evelyn "Champagne" King.

Personnel and credits 
Musicians

Paul Bailey – instruments
Steve Brewster – instruments
Tamar Braxton – background vocals
Toni Braxton – instruments, vocals
Heather Bright – background vocals
Jimmy Carter – instruments
City of Prague Philhomic Orchestra – instruments
Don E – instruments
James Fauntleroy – background vocals
Oak Felder – instruments
Paul Franklin – instruments
Frank E – instruments
Andrew Hey – instruments
John Hobbs – instruments
Jeff King – instruments
Josh Lopez – instruments
Jacob Luttrell – instruments
Harvey Mason, Jr. – instruments
John Parricelli – instruments
Makeba Riddick – background vocals
Lucas Secon – instruments, background vocals
Troy Taylor – instruments
Bobby Terry – instruments
Dapo Torimiro – instruments
Michael Warren – instruments
Brandon White – instruments

Production

Busbee – producer
Toni Braxton – producer
Oak Felder – producer
David Foster – producer
Simon Franglen – producer
Justin "DJ Frank E" Franks – producer
Chuck Harmony – producer
Steve Mac – producer
Harvey Mason, Jr. – producer
D'Mile – producer
Madd Scientist – producer
Lucas Secon – producer
Troy Taylor – producer
Michael Warren – producer

Charts

Weekly charts

Year-end charts

Release history

References

External links
 
 

2010 albums
Toni Braxton albums
Atlantic Records albums
Albums produced by DJ Frank E
Dance-pop albums by American artists
Albums produced by Oak Felder
Albums produced by D'Mile
Albums produced by Stargate
Albums produced by busbee
Albums produced by Chuck Harmony
Albums produced by David Foster